Varsity TV was an American television network. It was owned by Varsity Media Group, Inc. The network was launched in 1999. In March 2006, Verizon FiOS added the channel on the lineup. On January 15, 2009, the channel shut down and ceased operations.

References

Television channels and stations established in 1999
Television channels and stations disestablished in 2009
Defunct television networks in the United States
1999 establishments in the United States